Kurt Asle Arvesen (born 9 February 1975) is a Norwegian former professional road bicycle racer, who competed as a professional between 1998 and 2011. Arvesen is from Eresfjord, Nesset. He won the Norwegian National Road Race Championships five times, as well as stages in each of the three Grand Tours.

He currently works as a directeur sportif for UCI ProTeam .

Career

After winning the gold medal at the 1997 Under-23 World Championship as an amateur, Arvesen turned pro with Italian team Asics in 1998, where later Team CSC teammate Ivan Basso rode as a stagiare. The two riders moved on to Davide Boifava's team, Riso Scotti-Vinavil in 1999, which was renamed Amica Chips-Tacconi Sport in 2000, but Arvesen's three years in Italy did not get him the results his World Under-23 Championships win had foretold. In 2001 Arvesen and Basso split up, as Arvesen moved on to Danish Team Fakta, where he experienced his most successful years culminating in a stage win in the 2003 Giro d'Italia.

At Team CSC, Arvesen has been riding mostly as a domestique, but he won the stage race Danmark Rundt as well as CSC Classic in 2004. For the 2004 Tour de France, Arvesen helped team captain Basso finish second overall, and he was named the toughest rider in the peloton when he finished the three-weeks long race after crashing severely on several stages.

For the 2005 Tour de France he would once more ride in support of Basso. This time Arvesen had the strength to ride aggressively, and on the 17th stage of the race, he got in a breakaway with 16 other riders which lasted all the way to the finish line. As the leading group slowly disintegrated, he and Italian rider Paolo Savoldelli were the last riders for the sprint, but Savoldelli was too fast for Arvesen.

In the 2006 UCI ProTour spring season Arvesen got a handful of top 10 placings. When he crashed into a right-swinging car during a training ride in April, he got away with road rash and a bruised right knee and less than a week later he rode Rund um den Henninger Turm, though he did not ride the race to its end.  He finally won Ster Elektrotoer, but that was not sufficient to secure a place in the 2006 Tour de France roster. Arvesen became runner-up in Paris–Tours.
In the 2007 Giro d'Italia Arvesen won stage 8 after beating Paolo Bettini in the finish. On July 16 he won stage 11 in the 2008 Tour de France, his first ever stage win in the tour. After engaging in a successful breakaway, he finished winning two centimeters ahead of number two.

Arversen's 2009 tour came to a disappointing end on Stage 10 just after passing Guéret.  The Norwegian champion claimed his only stage victory in the Tour in Foix 12 months previously, however on Tuesday 14 July 2009 he crashed around the 88 km mark of the stage between Limoges and Issoudun. Curiously, before the start of the 10th Stage he joked on the floor pretending he had fallen.

After a week of rumours, it was official on 10 September 2009 that Arvesen would be joining  from the 2010-season, along with fellow Norwegians Edvald Boasson Hagen and Lars Petter Nordhaug. The start of the 2010 season with Team Sky was marred by injury for Arvesen. After winning the 1st stage of Tour of Qatar (TTT), Arvesen crashed on the following stage, breaking his collarbone. He returned to the bike in time to participate in Tirreno–Adriatico.

He became a Sports Director with the team in 2015. In October 2016 it was announced that he would leave Sky and become Sports Director for the Norwegian UCI Continental squad . In March 2017 it was also announced that he had agreed a permanent contract with Eurosport to act as an analyst for the channel, having appeared as a guest commentator with the station for several years.

Major results

1997
 1st  Road race, UCI Road World Under-23 Championships
 1st  Road race, National Road Championships
1998
 1st  Road race, National Road Championships
2000
 7th Circuito de Getxo
2001
 1st  Time trial, National Road Championships
 1st Stage 9 Herald Sun Tour
 3rd Scheldeprijs
2002
 1st  Road race, National Road Championships
 1st  Overall Tour of Sweden
 1st Schynberg Rundfahrt
 1st  Mountains classification Paris–Corrèze
 2nd Overall Danmark Rundt
1st  Points classification
1st Stage 3
 4th G.P. Costa degli Etruschi
 7th Rund um den Henninger Turm
 8th Overall Ronde van Nederland
2003
 1st Stage 10 Giro d'Italia
 4th GP Lugano
 4th Cholet-Pays de la Loire
 5th GP Ouest–France
 5th Arnhem–Veenendaal Classic
 7th Brabantse Pijl
2004
 1st  Overall Danmark Rundt
 1st CSC Classic
 3rd Overall Driedaagse van West-Vlaanderen
 9th Overall Ster Elektrotoer
 9th Road race, Olympic Games
2005
 2nd Overall Danmark Rundt
 4th Grand Prix de Wallonie
 10th Overall Critérium International
2006
 1st  Time trial, National Road Championships
 1st  Overall Ster Elektrotoer
 1st Stage 1 (TTT) Vuelta a España
 2nd Paris–Tours
 3rd Overall Tour de Wallonie
 4th Overall Danmark Rundt
 7th Brabantse Pijl
 8th Dwars door Vlaanderen
 10th Overall Tirreno–Adriatico
 10th Gent–Wevelgem
 10th Giro del Piemonte
2007
 1st  Overall Danmark Rundt
1st Stage 3
 1st Stage 8 Giro d'Italia
 1st GP Herning
 2nd Rund um den Henninger Turm
 3rd Overall Ster Elektrotoer
2008
 1st  Road race, National Road Championships
 1st Stage 11 Tour de France
 1st E3 Prijs Vlaanderen
 1st Stenlille–Dianalund
 7th Tour of Flanders
 10th Milan–San Remo
2009
 1st  Road race, National Road Championships

Grand Tour general classification results timeline

References

External links
 
 Profile at Team CSC
 1996 UCI Road World Under-23 Championships from Youtube
 Palmares on Cycling Base (French)

1975 births
Living people
Norwegian male cyclists
Olympic cyclists of Norway
Cyclists at the 2000 Summer Olympics
Cyclists at the 2004 Summer Olympics
Cyclists at the 2008 Summer Olympics
Norwegian Giro d'Italia stage winners
Norwegian Tour de France stage winners
Danmark Rundt winners
People from Molde
Norwegian sports broadcasters
Cycling announcers